St. Mark's Cemetery is a historic cemetery located on E. Main Street on the corner of St. Mark's Place in Mount Kisco, Westchester County, New York. The earliest section was established in 1761, and the earliest gravestone to 1773. The last burial was in 1940.  The cemetery served as a burial ground for two religious denominations, Revolutionary War soldiers, and local citizens.  It served as the site of a temporary army hospital during the Battle of White Plains.

It was listed on the National Register of Historic Places in 1988.

See also
 National Register of Historic Places listings in northern Westchester County, New York

References

Cemeteries on the National Register of Historic Places in New York (state)
National Register of Historic Places in Westchester County, New York
Mount Kisco, New York
1761 establishments in the Province of New York
Cemeteries in Westchester County, New York